Vice District is one of six districts of the province Sechura in Peru.

References